Children of Chance is a 1930 British comedy crime film directed by Alexander Esway and starring Elissa Landi, Mabel Poulton, John Stuart and John Longden.

Production
It was made at Elstree Studios by British International Pictures, the country's biggest production company of the era. A separate German version Children of Fortune was also made. Such multiple-language versions were common during the early years of sound before dubbing became more established.

Synopsis
Binnie, a struggling young actress, is mistaken for her doppelganger the model Lia Monta. Unfortunately Monta, a woman with a shady past has that very same day stolen some precious pearls and fled to the Continent. Binnie, delighted to have won a film contract with a leading producer who be believes her to be Monta, is forced to face the consequences of the other woman's theft.

Cast
 Elissa Landi as Binnie/Lia Monta
 Mabel Poulton as Molly
 John Stuart as Gordon
 John Longden as Jeffrey
 Gus McNaughton as H.K. Zinkuyell
 Wallace Lupino as O.K. Johnson
 Gus Sharland as Hugo
 John Deverell as Harold
 Charles Dormer as Dude
 Dorothy Minto as Sally
 Kay Hammond as Joyce
 Aileen Despard (credited as Eileen Despard) as Beryl

References

Bibliography
 Low, Rachael. Filmmaking in 1930s Britain. George Allen & Unwin, 1985.
 Wood, Linda. British Films, 1927-1939. British Film Institute, 1986.

External links

1930 films
Films shot at British International Pictures Studios
1930s English-language films
Films directed by Alexander Esway
British crime comedy films
1930s crime comedy films
Films set in London
British black-and-white films
British multilingual films
1930 multilingual films
1930 comedy films
Films shot in Hertfordshire
1930s British films